Kepler-20 is a star 929 light-years from Earth in the constellation Lyra with a system of six known planets. The apparent magnitude of this star is 12.51, so it cannot be seen with the unaided eye. It is slightly smaller than the Sun, with 94% of the Sun's radius and about 91% of the Sun's mass. The abundance of elements other than hydrogen or helium, what astronomers term the metallicity, is approximately the same as in the Sun. It may be older than the Sun, although the margin of error here is relatively large.

Planetary system

On December 20, 2011, the Kepler Space Telescope team reported the discovery of a five-planet system containing three small gas giants and the first two Earth-sized extrasolar planets, Kepler-20e (the first known extrasolar planet smaller than Earth orbiting a main-sequence star) and Kepler-20f, orbiting a Sun-like star. The three other Neptune-sized planets in the system, Kepler-20b, Kepler-20c, and Kepler-20d, all orbit similarly close to the star. Kepler-20g is a non-transiting Neptunian world.

The masses of e and f are expected masses. Their masses are uncertain as they are too small to detect via radial velocity with current technology.

All planets are at small near resonances; proceeding outwards, they are 3:2, 4:2, 2:1, 4:1. The planetary orbits in current form are highly sensitive to perturbations caused by outer planets, therefore assuming stability, no additional gas giant planets can be located closer than 30 AU from the parent star.

See also
 55 Cancri
 Kepler-11
 Kepler-33
 List of multiplanetary systems

References

External links

 Multimedia:
 Video (01:33) NASA Discovers First Earth-like Exoplanet Orbiting A Sun-like Star.

 
Lyra (constellation)
Planetary systems with six confirmed planets
G-type main-sequence stars
70
Planetary transit variables
J19104752+4220194